San Juan Province may refer to:
San Juan Province, Argentina
San Juan Province (Dominican Republic)

Province name disambiguation pages

pt:San Juan (província)